Hallam railway station is located on the Pakenham line in Victoria, Australia. It serves the south-eastern Melbourne suburb of Hallam, and it opened on 1 December 1880 as Hallam's Road. It was renamed Hallam on 2 May 1904.

Disused station General Motors is located between Hallam and Dandenong.

History

Hallam station opened on 1 December 1880 as a single platform, just over three years after the railway line from Dandenong was extended to Pakenham. The station gets its name from Hallam's Road, itself named after William Hallam, who settled in the area in 1856 and operated a general store and hotel on the present day corner of the Princes Highway and Hallam Road.

In 1954, a goods siding at the station was closed. Between 1955 and 1956, the former ground level platforms were provided, when the line between Dandenong and Narre Warren was duplicated.

In 1959, flashing light signals replaced hand gates at the former Hallam South Road level crossing, which was located at the Down end of the station, with boom barriers provided in 1985. On 16 July 1990, the station officially operated for passenger business only.

Sometime during or after 1995, the former ground level station shelters were provided.

On 4 May 2010, as part of the 2010/2011 State Budget, $83.7 million was allocated to upgrade Hallam to a Premium Station, along with nineteen others. However, in March 2011, this was scrapped by the Baillieu Government.

On 2 April 2022, the Hallam South Road level crossing was abolished as part of the Level Crossing Removal Project, and was replaced with a rail bridge over the road, which included a new, rebuilt elevated station. On 2 May of that year, the rebuilt station opened.

Platforms and services

Hallam has two side platforms. It is serviced by Metro Trains' Pakenham line services.

Platform 1:
  all stations and limited express services to Flinders Street

Platform 2:
  all stations services to Pakenham

By late 2025, it is planned that trains on the Pakenham line will be through-routed with those on the Sunbury line, via the new Metro Tunnel.

Transport links

Cranbourne Transit operates three routes via Hallam station, under contract to Public Transport Victoria:
 : Westfield Fountain Gate – Lynbrook station
 : Cranbourne Park Shopping Centre – Dandenong station
 : to Amberley Park (Narre Warren South)

Ventura Bus Lines operates two routes via Hallam station, under contract to Public Transport Victoria:
 : Endeavour Hills Shopping Centre – Hampton Park Shopping Centre
  : Dandenong station – Cranbourne (Saturday and Sunday mornings only)

Gallery

References

External links
 Melway map at street-directory.com.au

Railway stations in Melbourne
Railway stations in Australia opened in 1880
Railway stations in the City of Casey